is a video game franchise originally developed by Hudson Soft and currently owned by Konami. The original game, also known as Bakudan Otoko (爆弾男), was released in Japan in July 1983 and has since spawned multiple sequels and spin-offs released on numerous platforms, as well as several anime and manga adaptations. 

As of 1998, the series has sold over 10 million copies. The most recent iteration, Amazing Bomberman, was released on August 5, 2022 on Apple Arcade.

Gameplay

Most games in the Bomberman franchise largely revolve around two modes of play; single player campaigns where the player must defeat enemies and reach an exit to progress through levels, and multiplayer modes where players must attempt to eliminate each other and be the last one standing. Gameplay involves strategically placing down bombs, which explode in multiple directions after a certain amount of time, in order to destroy obstacles and kill enemies and other players. The player can pick up various power-ups, giving them benefits such as larger explosions or the ability to place more bombs down at a time. The player is killed if they touch an enemy or get caught up in a bomb's explosion, including their own, requiring players to be cautious of their own bomb placement. In addition to the main maze-based Bomberman games, some spin-off titles involve adventure, platformer, puzzle, and kart racing gameplay.

Story

Plot
Several games in the series are loosely connected through recurring characters and settings.

The 1985 game for Famicom / Nintendo Entertainment System (and Atomic Punk for Game Boy) begins with "Bomberman" (the eponymous character of the game) who worked day in and day out making bombs in an underground compound, but he dreamed of liberty, so he plotted his escape. After hearing a rumor that robots reaching the surface become human, he decides to escape. He was aided by the only skill he knew, bomb making. He uses the bombs to destroy the enemies preventing his escape and to clear blocked walls. When he reaches the surface, he transforms into an organic human being and becomes known as the "Runner". This storyline is not present in some versions, such as Bomberman Party Edition, and this setting was largely abandoned but used for connections with Hudson's Lode Runner games and Bomberman: Act Zero. 

In the Bomberman for the TurboGrafx-16, Bomberman is used as a prototype for further Bomberman robots by Dr. Mitsumori. To distinguish him from other Bombermen, the main character is given the name White Bomberman (or White Bomber). In earlier appearances, the second Bomberman model (known as Black Bomberman) was usually the rival or the main antagonist. 

In the Super Bomberman series, the two characters would regularly join forces to handle bigger threats, most notably the evil alien Professor Bagura and the Five Dastardly Bombers, the Hige Hige Bandits (led by Mujoe and Dr. Mechado), as well as a mysterious rival known as Regulus.

Characters 
 Bomberman, also referred to as "White Bomberman", "White Bomber", "Cheerful White" (in Bomberman Land Touch!), "Bomber John" (in Bomberman Touch), and (in Japan) "Shirobon", is the hero of the series. In the standard games, he is the protagonist and player-character. He is usually portrayed as the heroic yet cheerful type, often saving his home planet from disaster. Like all Bombermen, he has the ability to generate bombs in his hands. In later games, such as Bomberman Max and Bomberman Tournament, he is shown to be part of an interplanetary police force stationed at Bomber Base. The White Bomberman also made appearances in other games, such as Wario Blast: Featuring Bomberman!, a Bomberman game featuring Bomberman alongside Nintendo mascot Mario's rival, Wario (although that was not the case in Japan). He also appears in DreamMix TV World Fighters—a Hudson fighting game with characters from Hudson Soft, Konami, and Takara, and in the Nintendo fighting game Super Smash Bros. Ultimate as a non-playable Assist Trophy and as a Mii Fighter outfit. He even makes a giant playable appearance in Star Parodier, a spoof of the Star Soldier series, which is also developed by Hudson Soft. He has been featured in three anime series; Bomberman B-Daman Bakugaiden and Bomberman B-Daman Bakugaiden V are based on the marble shooting game B-Daman, while Bomberman Jetters inspired the video game of the same name. In the anime Bomberman Jetters, he had an older brother named Mighty. and he also made a cameo appearance in the 2015 film, Pixels.
 Black Bomberman ("Cool Black" in Bomberman Land Touch!) looks identical to Bomberman, only he is colored black and doesn't have white pants. In many of his first appearances, he was shown to be the main rival of Bomberman, often performing acts such as robbing banks to fight him. He eventually becomes a gradual friend of Bomberman, and acts as the second player in the two-player story modes of the games. Hudson has given him a cool and collected personality in the later games. In his first appearance, he also led Red Bomber, Blue Bomber, Green Bomber, and Yellow Bomber.
 Max first appears in Bomberman Max as one of the main characters. He is somewhat competitive and arrogant, as shown in his first appearance that despite the urgency of the mission, he challenges Bomberman to a contest to see who can gather the most Charaboms. Max wears a black suit of armor with a helmet that completely hides his face. He is also a playable character in the game Bomberman Jetters, where he joins Bomberman in the fight against the Hige Hige Bandits again, and he is an unlockable character for the battle mode of Bomberman Generation. He is also unlockable in Bomberman 2 for Nintendo DS. His backstory is greatly expanded upon in Bomberman Tournament, revealing him to be a native of the planet Phantarion who became a cyborg due to injuries sustained during the first invasion attempt of the Five Dastardly Bombers.
 Dr. Ein (also known as Professor Ein) is a scientist who assists Bomberman. He is eccentric and doesn't seem to show many emotions. He is fat, has white spiky hair, and glasses with spirals covering the lenses. Despite never having a playable appearance, one of the customization sets in Bomberman Live lets Bomberman wear Dr. Ein's lab coat and glasses.
 Charabon (also known as Karabon) are small creatures that help Bomberman progress by granting him abilities. First appearing in Bomberman Max, each game featuring Charabon features a unique set of them. Bomberman often finds Charabon trapped in cages, and he can partner with one to use its ability. He can also fuse them together and battle them against others. Pommy is a recurring Charabon, who first appears in Bomberman 64: The Second Attack, where he is a loyal, but cowardly sidekick and a mimic. He is capable of shooting lightning and taking on many different forms. In Bomberman Tournament, he can teleport. Charabons have four possible elemental attributes, of which they can have up to three: Fire, represented by dinosaurs and dragons; Water, represented by fish and mollusks; Earth, represented by beasts; and Electric, represented by Pommy's various forms. The elemental attributes have a simple rock-paper-scissors relationship, with Water being strong against Fire, Fire being strong against Earth, Earth being strong against Electric, and Electric being strong against Water (Water and Earth are neutral against each other and usually don't harm each other; the same is true of Fire and Electric).
 Louie (also known as Rooi) are kangaroo-like animals with rabbit ears who help Bomberman by letting him ride on their backs. In Super Bomberman 4, they were replaced by various animals, and in Saturn Bomberman by the dinosaur-like Tyra / Tirra.
 The Bad Bombers (a.k.a. the Five Dastardly Bombers) are a gang of five recurring boss enemies in several games of the series. They were produced by Professor Bagura. Magnet Bomber sports a scarf-like cape, has a magnet shape attached to his helmet, and uses bombs that are attracted to his enemies. Golem Bomber is much larger than the others and he utilizes fire bombs. Pretty Bomber is distinguished from her male counterparts by her pink skirt, yellow neckerchief, and the large yellow heart attached to her helmet. She also appears as a close friend to Bomberman in several games, where both White and Black Bomber are attracted to her. Brain Bomber(known as Phantom Bomber in Super Bomberman R) is the engineer of the group, who wears a cloak and has the symbol of a crown on his helmet. He is shorter than the other characters and sometimes floats above the group. Plasma Bomber is the leader. Plasma Bomber wears a neckerchief and has a lightning bolt attached to his helmet that can create electric currents.
 Professor Bagura (also known as Bagular, Burglar or Bugler) is the main villain in many of the games. He resembles a blue and white, large, elderly man with a bushy white beard, a monocle, and a cape. He first appears as the main villain of Bomberman '94, in which he attempts to run a comet-disguised ship into Planet Bomber after throwing it into chaos. He later appears in several games, including Super Bomberman 3, Super Bomberman 4, Bomberman Hero,  Bomberman World, and Neo Bomberman. In some odd appearances, he is reduced to a brain that wants to rebuild an empire and wants revenge on Bomberman. In the anime, he is the true leader of the Hige Hige Bandits, with Mujoe as his second-in-command. Dr. Mechado also serves the group by creating technology, such as the Hige-Hige Bandits, small robotic minions who are very weak and serve under Mujoe.

Other media 
Bomberman B-Daman Bakugaiden
Bomberman Jetters
2002 video game

See also 
 Battle royale game
 Last man standing (video games)

References

External links 
Bomberman Series Official Site - Hudson Soft (Japanese) on Wayback Machine
Hudson - Bomberman Portal Page - Hudson Soft (US) on Wayback Machine
Bomberman Series Game List - Hudson Soft (Japanese) on Wayback Machine
Bomberman games on MobyGames

 
Hudson Soft games
Konami franchises
Extraterrestrial superheroes
Robot superheroes
Video game superheroes
Video game franchises introduced in 1983
Video game franchises introduced in 1985